Free Willy 3: The Rescue is a 1997 American family film directed by Sam Pillsbury and written by John Mattson. Released by Warner Bros. under their Warner Bros. Family Entertainment banner, it is the sequel to Free Willy 2: The Adventure Home in addition to being the third film in the Free Willy franchise and final installment of the original storyline as well as the last to be released theatrically. Jason James Richter and August Schellenberg reprised their roles from the previous films while Annie Corley, Vincent Berry and Patrick Kilpatrick joined the cast. The story revolves around Jesse and Randolph attempting to stop a group of whalers, led by its ruthless captain, from illegally hunting Willy while secretly receiving help from an unlikely source involving the captain's young son after an accident changed his view on whales.

Filming took place in British Columbia, Canada from July 31 to October 10, 1996 where several scenes were shot in Vancouver, Britannia Beach, Squamish and Howe Sound. The film is dedicated to Free Willy co-writer Keith A. Walker who died two months after production was completed. 

Free Willy 3: The Rescue premiered on August 8, 1997 to mixed reviews from critics and was a box office bomb, grossing $3.4 million.

Plot 
Jesse is sixteen years old and works as an orca-researcher on a research ship called the Noah alongside his old friend Randolph. He's moved away from Glen and Annie who were promised by Randolph to keep him out of trouble. They suspect that Willy and his pod are being illegally hunted by whalers posing as commercial fishermen. Aboard just such a ship, the Botany Bay, Max Wesley, who is ten years old, takes his first trip to sea with his father, John, a whaler from a long line of whalers and learns the true unlawful nature of the family business. During his first hunt, Max accidentally falls overboard and comes face to face with Willy. From this point on, Max is working against his own father, teaming with Jesse to save Willy from becoming a part of an underground market for whale meat. Jesse goes to his and Randolph's head boss Drake about the threat to the whales, but he refuses to take action until Jesse manages to get proof. During their first meeting, Jesse introduces Max to Willy properly after learning of Max's experience and his liking of whales.

Jesse manages to sneak on board the Botany Bay to steal a sample of the spears that are used to shoot the whales and discovers that the whalers are heading back out to go after Willy and his pod, using an audio recording of a song which Jesse plays on his harmonica as a lure for Willy, who won't realize that it's not Jesse until it's too late. Drake plans to call for help the next day, but knowing it will be too late then, Jesse, Randolph and one of their fellow researchers, Drew, steal the Noah research boat from her mooring and go after the whalers themselves. John is angry because he learns that his son isn't on his side and believes that Max tried to sabotage the engine (Jesse had actually been the one who did this), but it doesn't stop him. Max jumps into the water, forcing the whalers to pause their pursuit of the whales to perform a "man overboard" rescue for Max, which gave Jesse, Randolph and Drew enough time to catch up.

After the trio unsuccessfully use a flare gun and their boat's P.A. system to try to bluff the whalers into stopping, Jesse rams the Noah into the Botany Bay just as John fires a harpoon, the jolt causing the harpoon to miss Willy and knocking John into the water. Willy tries to kill him, by biting at him, but Jesse and Max manage to convince Willy to spare him. Max's father then gets trapped under a net and nearly drowns as the net drags him down and ultimately comes face to face with Willy himself. This time, Willy, instead of killing him, saves him by pushing him to the surface and holding him there long enough for Jesse and Randolph to rescue him. The Coastal Marine Patrol arrive, having been summoned on the radio by Jesse before he rammed the Botany Bay, and catch the whalers (who are stunned by Willy rescuing their boss) in the act and arrest them. Being saved by Willy causes John to realize that he was wrong about the whales and he apologizes to Max. John is not sure where to go from here as his whole life has been about whaling, but Max tells him he is his father and forgives him.

Later, Jesse, Randolph, Drew and Max witness the birth of Willy's son (the mother is an orca named "Nicky"). Max thought about using Willy's name until Jesse suggests Max's name for the newborn calf. The film ends with Willy, his family, and the rest of the pod swimming away out to the open sea.

Cast 
 Jason James Richter as Jesse
 August Schellenberg as Randolph Johnson
 Annie Corley as Drew Halbert
 Vincent Berry as Max Wesley
 Patrick Kilpatrick as John Wesley (credited as "Wesley")
 Tasha Simms as Mary Wesley
 Peter LaCroix as Sanderson
 Stephen E. Miller as Dineen
 Ian Tracey as Kron
 Matthew Walker as Captain Drake
 Roger R. Cross as 1st Mate Stevens
 Rick Burgess as Smiley
 Roman Danylo as Pizza Kid

Soundtrack

Free Willy 3: The Rescue marked the only entry to not feature musical contributions from Michael Jackson. Instead of Basil Poledouris, the music was composed and conducted by Cliff Eidelman and performed by the Toronto Symphony Orchestra. The score experts from the songs "Connection" and the Free Willy main theme are heard including at the conclusion of film where the song "A New Family" used the latter.

Songs featured in the film but not on the soundtrack are "China Grove" by The Doobie Brothers, "What Do You See?" by Skydiggers, "Big Sky" by The Reverend Horton Heat and "Pressin' On" by Little Charlie & the Nightcats.

The soundtrack was released on July 29, 1997 by Varèse Sarabande.

Track listing

Reception 
Free Willy 3 received generally mixed reviews from critics.

On Rotten Tomatoes, the film has an approval rating of 44% with an average rating of 5.2/10, based on reviews from 16 critics. Audiences polled by CinemaScore gave the film an average grade of "B+" on an A+ to F scale.

Siskel & Ebert called Free Willy 3 the best movie in the series. Roger Ebert gave it a thumbs-up and 3 out of 4 stars in his review, writing that "the series has grown up" and "smart kids will enjoy it".

References

External links 
 
 

1997 films
1997 children's films
1997 drama films
1990s children's drama films
1990s English-language films
American children's drama films
American sequel films
Fictional orcas
Films set on ships
Films about children
Films about dolphins
Films about families
Films about father–son relationships
Films about friendship
Films about marine biology
Films about Native Americans
Films about orphans
Films about ship hijackings
Films about whaling
Films directed by Sam Pillsbury
Films featuring underwater diving
Films scored by Cliff Eidelman
Films shot in Canada
Films shot in Vancouver
Films shot in British Columbia
Films with underwater settings
Free Willy (franchise)
Puppet films
Regency Enterprises films
Seafaring films
Warner Bros. films
1990s American films